Forbidden Paths is a 1917 American drama silent film directed by Robert Thornby and written by Beatrice DeMille, Leighton Osmun and Eve Unsell. The film stars Vivian Martin, Sessue Hayakawa, Tom Forman, Carmen Phillips, James Neill and Ernest Joy. The film was released on July 12, 1917, by Paramount Pictures.

Plot

Cast 
Vivian Martin as Mildred Thornton
Sessue Hayakawa as Sato
Tom Forman as Harry Maxwell
Carmen Phillips as Benita Ramirez
James Neill as James Thornton
Ernest Joy as American ambassador
Paul Weigel as Luis Valdez

References

External links 
 

1917 films
1910s English-language films
Silent American drama films
1917 drama films
Paramount Pictures films
Films directed by Robert Thornby
American black-and-white films
American silent feature films
1910s American films